Braemar is a former railway station which was located on the Picton – Mittagong loop railway line. It served Braemar, a small town in the Macarthur Region of New South Wales, Australia.

History
The station opened on 1 March 1867 as Rushs Platform, and was renamed Braemar in September 1892. The station along with the Loop Line was closed in 1978. There are no remains of the station. At present, the station only services a concrete sleeper supplier and the company Clyde Engineering.

References

Disused regional railway stations in New South Wales
Railway stations in Australia opened in 1867
Railway stations closed in 1978
Main Southern railway line, New South Wales
Macarthur (New South Wales)